Oladipupo Ogundele, (popularly known as DIPP) born in Nigeria, is a Nigerian singer-songwriter and dancer. He has won several music awards including the awards for Best Choreography at the NMVA - Nigerian Music Video Awards 2010'. He adopted the stage name DIPP from the shortening of his first name.

Biography 
Born into a family of five boys in the early eighties, Dipp began his musical career at the age of nine, singing along to the hits of Michael Jackson while imitating the dance moves of the master of the falsettos and stage performance.

Education 
Dipp has a BSc in Building from the Ahmadu Bello University, Zaria.

Music career 
A singer-songwriter, Dipp, started recording his debut solo album in 2005; the album now complete, will bring to the listener a perfect harmony of indigenous and international renditions of the R&B genre while vividly describing the struggles of a man striving to achieve his destiny. In 2009, he won the Best Special Effects and Editing award at the Sound City Music Awards for his Dangerous which was directed by special-effects wizard, MEX. Later in the year he released his second single Pop Off Selecta. When the video dropped in 2010 DIPP produced yet another stunning video with the aid of MEX. In less than two months Pop Off Selecta had risen up the charts and peaked at the number one spot in Sound City Top Ten Videos chart for many weeks. He recently won two awards at the NMVA2010 – Best Use of Special Effects and Best Choreography.

Discography 
Debut album Future Is Now (2011) features the hits
 Fly Away
 Let It Go ft. Sossick
 I Do
 Which Is the Way
 Follow Me Go
 Kosorombe ft. Da Grin
 Snow in Africa
 Good Girls ft. YQ
 Jeje
 Rock Your Body ft. Yemi Alade
 Jezebel ft. Waje
 Pop Off Selecta
 Fire in the Club ft. Maytronomy

Bonus tracks
 Dangerous ft. MI
 Good Girls remix ft. YQ, Mode 9, Maytronomy, Beazy and Ill Bliss
 Good Girls remix ft. YQ, Blaise, Kel, and Muna

Awards

Management 

DIPP is one of the partners and the first artist to be produced under Effyzzie Entertainment which was nominated for the "Best Producer" NMVA 2010.

References 

1980 births
Living people
People from Ibadan
Nigerian singer-songwriters
21st-century Nigerian singers